Léon Lacabane (21 November 1798 – 24 December 1884) was a 19th-century French historian, librarian and palaeographer.

Biography 
The son of the notary of Fons, Léon Lacabane studied in Figeac before moving to Paris in order to study law, but eventually studied history at the École Nationale des Chartes (1821). First the secretary of the Director of agriculture and stud farms in the Ministry of Interior, he joined the Royal library in 1829. He made his entire career in this institution and retired in 1871. He helped open the resources to researchers and managed to keep to the library the Cabinet of titles claimed by the Imperial Archives.

He was also professor of paleography at the École des Chartes (1846) which he headed from 1857 to 1871.

External links 
 Léon Lacabane on data.bnf.fr
 Obituary by Louis de Mas-Latrie on Persée
 Notice on Du Côté de Puy-blanc
 Observations sur la géographie et l'histoire du Quercy et du Limousin, à propos de la publication du cartulaire de Beaulieu by Léon Lacabane on Persée

French librarians
19th-century French historians
École Nationale des Chartes alumni
French palaeographers
French medievalists
Officiers of the Légion d'honneur
People from Lot (department)
1798 births
1884 deaths